Eshnunna (modern Tell Asmar in Diyala Governorate, Iraq) was an ancient Sumerian (and later Akkadian) city and city-state in central Mesopotamia 12.6 miles northwest of Tell Agrab and 15 miles northwest of Tell Ishchali. Although situated in the Diyala Valley north-west of Sumer proper, the city nonetheless belonged securely within the Sumerian cultural milieu. It is sometimes, in archaeological papers, called Ashnunnak or Tuplias.

The tutelary deity of the city was Tishpak (Tišpak) though other gods, including Sin, Adad,  and Inanna of Kititum were also worshiped there. The personal goddesses of the rulers were Belet-Šuḫnir and Belet-Terraban.

History

Early Bronze
Inhabited since the Jemdet Nasr period, around 3000 BC, Eshnunna was a major city during the Early Dynastic period of Mesopotamia. It is known, from cuneiform records and excavations, that the city was occupied in the Akkadian period though its extent was noticeably less than it reached in Ur III times. Areas of the Northern Palace date to this period and show some of the earliest examples of widespread sewage disposal engineering including toilets in private homes.

The first known rulers of the city were a series of vassal governors under the Third dynasty of Ur. The last Ur III tablet found dated to the eighth month of the third year of Shu-Sin which is believed to mark the end of Ur control over Eshnunna. Eshnunna also stopped using the Ur calendar the next month.

Middle Bronze
After the fall of the Ur III empire there was a period of chaos in Akkad with numerous city-states vying for power. For a time Eshnunna was under the control of Subartu. Ishbi-Erra (in his 9th year, circa 2010 BC) of the southern Mesopotamia city of Isin defeated them and installed Nurahum as the new king of Eshnunna. About the time of the middle 19th century BC Babylon, under Sumu-la-El, and Eshnunna, under Ipiq-adad II, rose to fill the void. The boundary of control between the two city-states was fluid running somewhere about Tell ed-Der. Ipiq-adad II, like his son Naram-Sin, was deified.

Dadusha, ruler of Esnunna, entered into a treaty with Shamshi-Adad I and conducted joint military operations with his Kingdom of Upper Mesopotamia. By then the geopolitical situation had grown very complicated, as shown by a record found at Mari at the time of Dadusha's successor:

Mari (under Zimri-Lim) itself was also a power to the west, and Elam from the east often took an interest. To complicate thing even further, Eshnunna, besides at least 12,000 of their own troops, were joined by "an expeditionary force of Elamite troops" while "an army of 10000 Gutians under the command of their princess, Nawaritum, had 'their faces set toward Larsa'". The Gutians were then captured by the Elamites, after which they joined with their forces and Eshnunna. There are indications that Eshnunna was at that time a vassal of Elam under its ruler Siwe-Palar-Khuppak(r. 1778-1745 BC). If so this put the entire conflict into an Elam vs Babylon context.

In 1762 BC, in Year 31 of Hammurabi of Babylon, the Babylonians occupied the city of Eshnunna. He returned the titular deity of Assur which had been removed when Eshnunna captured the city of Assur.

Late Bronze
In the 12th century BC the Elamite ruler Shutruk-Nakhunte conquered Eshnunna and carried back a number of statues, ranging from the Akkadian period to the Old Babylonian period, to Susa.

Because of its promise of control over lucrative trade routes, Eshnunna could function somewhat as a gateway between Mesopotamian and Elamite culture. The trade routes gave it access to many exotic, sought-after goods such as horses from the north, copper, tin, and other metals and precious stones. In a grave in Eshnunna, a pendant made of copal from Zanzibar was found. A small number of seals and beads from the Indus Valley civilization were also found.

Archaeology

The remains of the ancient city are now preserved in the tell, or archaeological settlement mound, of Tell Asmar, some 50 miles northeast of Baghdad and 15 km in a straight line east of Baqubah. It was first located by Henri Pognon in 1892 but he neglected to report the location before he died in 1921. It was refound, after antiquities from the site began to appear in dealers shops in Baghdad, and excavated in six seasons between 1930 and 1936 by an Oriental Institute of the University of Chicago team led by Henri Frankfort with Thorkild Jacobsen, Pinhas Delougaz, Gordon Loud, and Seton Lloyd. The expedition's field secretary was Mary Chubb.

The primary focuses of the Chicago excavations were the palace and the attached temple (28 meters by 28 meters with 3 meter wide walls) of Su-Sin (termed by the excavators The Palace of the Rulers and The Gimilsin Temple respectively). The palace was built during the time of Ur III ruler Shugi and the Temple by governor Ituria to the deified Ur III ruler Su-Sin during his reign. The palace was partially destroyed during the reign of Bilalama but was eventually fully restored. The remaining excavation efforts were directed to the Abu Temple whose beginnings went back to the Early Dynastic I period and which had undergone a series of major changes over the centuries. A large Southern Building was discovered, believed to be from the time of Ipiq-Adad II, of which only the foundations remained. A number of private houses and a palace from the Akkadian period were also excavated. Much effort was also put into the search for E-sikil, temple of Tishpak, without success. In records written in Sumerian the temple is dedicated to Ninazu while those in Akkadian refer to Tishpak.

Despite the length of time since the excavations at Tell Asmar, the work of examining and publishing the remaining finds from that dig continues to this day.

These finds include, terracotta figurines, toys, necklaces, cylinder seals, and roughly 200 clay sealings and around 1,750 cuneiform tablets (about 1000 of which came from the palace). Because only inexperienced laborers were available many of the tablets were damaged or broken during the excavation. A project to clean, bake, and catalog all the tablets did not occur until the 1970s. The tablets from the Akkadian period were published in 1961. While most of the Eshnunna tablets are of an administrative nature 58 are letters which are rare in this time period. The letters are written in an early form of the Old Babylonian dialect of the Akkadian language, termed "archaic Old Babylonian". They are roughly in two groups a) earlier primarily from the reigns of Bilalama, Nur-ahum and Kirikiri and b) later primarily from the reigns of Usur-awassu, Ur-Ninmar, and Ipiq-Adad I.

In the late 1990s, Iraqi archaeologists worked at Tell Asmar. The results from that excavation have not yet been published.

Square Temple of Abu

During the Early Dynastic period, the Abu Temple at Tell Asmar (Eshnunna) went through a number of phases. This included the Early Dynastic Archaic Shrine, Square Temple, and Single-Shrine phases of construction. They, along with sculpture found there, helped form the basis for the three part archaeological separation of the Early Dynastic period into ED I, ED II, and ED III for the ancient Near East. A cache of 12 gypsum temple sculptures, in a geometric style, were found in the Square Temple; these are known as the Tell Asmar Hoard. They are some of the best known examples of ancient Near East sculpture. The group, now split up, show gods, priests and donor worshipers at different sizes, but all in the same highly simplified style. All have greatly enlarged inlaid eyes, but the tallest figure, the main cult image depicting the local god, has enormous eyes that give it a "fierce power".<ref> Henri Frankfort, "Sculpture of the Third Millennium B.C. from Tell Asmar and Khafajah, Oriental Institute Publication 44, 1939"</ref>

Laws of Eshnunna

The Laws of Eshnunna consist of two tablets, found at Shaduppum (Tell Harmal) and a fragment found at Tell Haddad, the ancient Mê-Turan.  They were written sometime around the reign of king Dadusha of Eshnunna and appear to not be official copies. When the actual laws were composed is unknown. They are similar to the Code of Hammurabi.Rosen, Bruce L. "Some Notes on Eshnunna Laws 20 and 21 and a Legal Reform in the Laws of Hammurapi." Revue d’Assyriologie et d’archéologie Orientale, vol. 71, no. 1, 1977, pp. 35–38

Rulers
Rulers from the Early Dynastic period and governors under the Akkadian empire are currently unknown. Eshnunna was ruled by vassal governors under Ur III for a time, then was independent under its own rulers for several centuries, and finally controlled by vassal governors under Babylon after the cities capture by Hammurabi. Rulership is unknown afterwards though the city did survive at least until the 12th century BC.

Excavation photographs

 See also 

 List of cities of the ancient Near East
 Khafajah
 Tell Ishchali
 Chronology of the ancient Near East
 Mari
 Andarig

References

Sources
 
 Civil, M., “A School Exercise from Tell Asmar”. Studia Orientalia Electronica, vol. 46, pp. 39–42, Apr. 2015
Reichel C. 2003, A Modern Crime and an Ancient Mystery: The Seal of Bilalama, in: Selz G. J. (ed.), Festschrift für Burkhart Kienast zu seinem 70. Geburtstage dargebracht von Freunden, Schülern und Kollegen, Alter Orient und Altes Testament 274, Münster, pp. 355–389.
  Pinhas Delougaz, "Pottery from the Diyala Region", Oriental Institute Publications 63, Chicago: The University of Chicago Press, 1952, 
  Pinhas Delougaz, Harold D. Hill, and Seton Lloyd, "Private Houses and Graves in the Diyala Region", Oriental Institute Publications 88, Chicago: The University of Chicago Press, 1967
  Pinhas Delougaz and Seton Lloyd with chapters by Henri Frankfort and Thorkild Jacobsen, "Pre-Sargonid Temples in the Diyala Region", Oriental Institute Publications 58, Chicago: The University of Chicago Press, 1942
 I. J. Gelb, "A Tablet of Unusual Type from Tell Asmar", Journal of Near Eastern Studies, vol. 1, no. 2, pp. 219–226, 1942
 Gentili, Paolo. “CHOGHA GAVANEH: AN OUTPOST OF EŠNUNNA ON THE ZAGROS MOUNTAINS?” Egitto e Vicino Oriente, vol. 35, 2012, pp. 165–73
  Max Hilzheimer, translated by Adolph A. Brux, "Animal Remains from Tell Asmar", Studies in Ancient Oriental Civilization 20, Chicago: The University of Chicago Press, 1941
 Lambert, W. G. “Narām-Sîn of Ešnunna or Akkad?” Journal of the American Oriental Society, vol. 106, no. 4, 1986, pp. 793–95
 Romano, Licia, "Who was Worshipped in the Abu Temple at Tell Asmar?", KASKAL'' 7, pp. 51–65, 2010
 Gary A. Rendsburg, "UT 68 and the Tell Asmar Seal", Orientalia, NOVA SERIES, vol. 53, no. 4, pp. 448–452, 1984
 Claudia E. Suter, "The Victory Stele of Dadusha of Eshnunna: A New Look at its Unusual  Culminating Scene", Ash-sharq Bulletin of the Ancient Near East Archaeological, Historical and Societal Studies, vol. 2, no. 2, pp. 1–29, 2018
 
 R. M. Whiting Jr., "An Old Babylonian Incantation from Tell Asmar", Zeitschrift für Assyriologie, vol. 75, pp. 179 – 187, 1985
 R. M. Whiting Jr., "Four seal impressions from Tell Asmar", Archiv für Orientforschung, vol. 34, pp. 30 – 35, 1987

External links
 The Diyala Project at the University of Chicago
 Tell Asmar Statue at the Oriental Institute of the University of Chicago

Populated places established in the 3rd millennium BC
States and territories established in the 3rd millennium BC
Early Dynastic Period (Mesopotamia)
Sumerian cities
Archaeological sites in Iraq
Former populated places in Iraq
Diyala Governorate
Former kingdoms